Oskar Nilsson (born April 12, 1991) is a Swedish professional ice hockey defenceman. He is currently playing with Skellefteå AIK of the Swedish Hockey League (SHL).

Nilsson made his Elitserien debut playing with Luleå HF during the 2011–12 Elitserien season.

References

External links

1991 births
Asplöven HC players
Frisk Asker Ishockey players
IK Oskarshamn players
Living people
Luleå HF players
People from Luleå
Skellefteå AIK players
Swedish expatriate ice hockey players in Norway
Swedish ice hockey defencemen
Sportspeople from Norrbotten County